Rindera is a genus of flowering plants belonging to the family Boraginaceae.

Its native range is north-western Africa (Algeria), south-eastern and eastern Europe (Greece, East European Russia, Romania, Ukraine and Yugoslavia) to western and central Asia (Afghanistan, Altay, Bulgaria, Iran, Iraq, Kazakhstan, Kyrgyzstan, Krasnoyarsk, Crimia, Lebanon-Syria, Mongolia, North Caucasus,  South European Russia, Tajikistan, Transcaucasus, Turkey, Turkmenistan, Uzbekistan) and Xinjiang (China).

The genus name of Rindera is in honour of Franz Andreas Rinder (1714–1772), a German-born Russian doctor in Orenburg and Moscow who discovered this plant in the Ural Mountains. 
It was first described and published in Reise Russ. Reich. Vol1 on page 486 in 1771.

Known species
According to Kew:

References

Boraginaceae
Boraginaceae genera
Plants described in 1771
Flora of Algeria
Flora of Greece
Flora of Romania
Flora of Yugoslavia
Flora of Eastern Europe
Flora of Altai (region)
Flora of Central Asia
Flora of the Caucasus
Flora of Western Asia
Flora of Xinjiang